Milon Kumar is a Bangladeshi cricketer. He made his List A debut for Khelaghar Samaj Kallyan Samity in the 2016–17 Dhaka Premier Division Cricket League on 30 April 2017.

References

External links
 

Year of birth missing (living people)
Living people
Bangladeshi cricketers
Khelaghar Samaj Kallyan Samity cricketers
Place of birth missing (living people)